According to the ancient writings, Zhao Ming(? – ?) was a Chinese noble man and an ancestor of the Shang dynasty. His family name was Zi (子). 

His father was Xie of Shang, born in Shangqiu (商丘), Henan (河南). Among the twelve ancestors of the King Tang of Shang, Zhao Ming was the second-generation king of the Shang Kingdom.

After the death of Xie, Zhao Ming inherited the throne and expanded the spread of civilization. After his death, his son Xiang Tu succeeded to the throne.

See also 
Emperor Ku — paternal grandfather of Zhao Ming

Bibliography 
Sima Qian. Records of the Grand Historian (史記). Volume 3.

Sources 

Shang dynasty kings